The Choice Lab is a research group at the Department of Economics, at the Norwegian School of Economics. In order to better understand economic and moral choices, The Choice Lab designs experiments that are implemented in controlled laboratory or field settings. The research group consists of researchers devoted to learning more about how people make economic and moral choices, and how governments, corporations and non-governmental institutions can use insights from this research to improve their decision making.

Research topics 
The research in The Choice Lab follows three distinct avenues. First, using economic experiments, the researchers study individual decision making, including how people are motivated by moral, risk, time, and institutional considerations. This research includes laboratory experiments with students, representative populations, criminals, and children, conducted in different parts of the world. The research group has also been involved in large scale internet experiments, field experiments, and surveys. Second, the research group studies implications of their experimental findings for important policy issues, including global income inequality, tax policy, and health care, and for management issues relevant to corporations and non-governmental organizations. Third, the research group studies, through axiomatic analysis, the normative justifications for different theories of justice, and how these theories relate to welfare, inequality and poverty measurement issues.

Research output 
The research output of the group has been published in top academic journals, including Science, American Economic Review, Journal of Political Economy, Journal of European Economic Association, Economic Journal, and Journal of Philosophy, as well as in numerous field journals.

Partners 
The research in The Choice Lab is mainly funded by research grants from the Research Council of Norway. The research group collaborates closely with two research centres of excellence at the University of Oslo; the Centre for the Study of Equality, Social Organization, and Performance (ESOP) and The Centre for the Study of Mind in Nature (CSMN), various governmental and non-governmental agencies, and business corporations.

References

External links
FAIR - The Choice Lab Website
Twitter
Facebook

Norwegian School of Economics
Research institutes in Norway